Myrmecia croslandi is a species of bull ant which is native to Australia. Myrmecia croslandi is a jumping type of bull ant, which means it could be called a jack jumper. Myrmecia croslandi are located around Australia. They can be seen throughout New South Wales and Queensland. Myrmecia croslandi was described by Taylor in 1991.

Taxonomy
Previously considered a kind of twin-better known and polymorphic species Myrmecia pilosula. Thanks to a unique chromosome being genetically isolated in 1986 and in 1991, Australian myrmecologist Robert Taylor described it as a separate species.

References

Myrmeciinae
Hymenoptera of Australia
Insects described in 1991
Insects of Australia